Taff Acre is a British television soap opera produced by HTV for the ITV network.

Taff Acre was a fictional village in South Wales, set just outside Cardiff. The series dealt with the lives of the Johnson family.

Transmitted twice a week between September and December 1981, the series was not renewed beyond its initial run of 26 episodes.

Cast
 Richard Davies - Max Johnson
 Rhoda Lewis - Beth Johnson
 Sue Jones-Davies - Sian Johnson
 Dewi Morris - Gareth Johnson
 Beth Morris - Cilla Johnson
 Stuart Davis - Wayne Johnson
 Myfanwy Talog - Jan Evans
 Robert Blythe - Danny Evans

References

External links
 

1980s British television soap operas
ITV soap operas
British television soap operas
1981 British television series debuts
1981 British television series endings
Television shows produced by Harlech Television (HTV)
Television shows set in Wales
English-language television shows
1980s Welsh television series